The Catholic Church in Uganda is part of the worldwide Catholic Church, under the spiritual leadership of the Pope in Rome. There are an estimated 34.1 million Catholics in the country, comprising around 39.3% of the total population in 2014.

The Catholic Church celebrates on June 3 the feast of the Uganda Martyrs — Saint Charles Lwanga and his companions — who were killed by King Mwanga II between 1885 and 1887.

Dioceses of Uganda 

Gulu
Arua
Lira
Nebbi
Kampala
Kasana–Luweero
Kiyinda–Mityana
Lugazi
Masaka
Mbarara
Fort Portal
Hoima
Kabale
Kasese
Tororo
Jinja
Kotido
Moroto
Soroti

Catholicism in Uganda Pre-Independence 

The first Europeans arrived in Uganda in 1862, when John Speke traversed the region in a search for the source of the Nile. European arrivals increased in the following years, and the White Fathers became the country's first Catholic missionaries in 1879. Their evangelization was effective, and the baptized population increased to 8,500 by 1888. The conversion of natives was met with hostility by Kabaka Mwanga II, King of Buganda, who saw the Christian religion as jeopardizing his authority. Catholic converts and those affiliated with the White Fathers were often arrested and put to death for their beliefs, their remains strewed across the land as a warning to anyone considering conversion. This persecution and violence climaxed in the killing of the Uganda Martyrs, when 22 Catholic converts were burned alive at Namugongo. Persecution directed toward the region's Christians slowed the arrival of missionaries during this time, and many left out of fear. However, Uganda was annexed by the British in 1890, which allowed for more Christian influence to grip the country. The Mill Hill Missionaries and Verona Fathers were the most prominent Catholic missionaries in the territory during the following years. Mill Hill Missionaries mainly evangelized in Eastern Uganda, while the Verona Fathers converted people in the North. Efforts to convert the indigenous population were successful, and the population of all Catholics in the country grew to 86,000 by the year 1905, and 370,000 in 1923, representing roughly 12.4% of the population. Uganda's first native Bishop, Joseph Kiwanuka, was consecrated in 1939, where he served as Apostolic Vicar of Masaka.

See also
List of Saints from Africa

References

External links
Catholic Church in Uganda 
Laity in Uganda

 
Uganda
Uganda